Amorphotheca resinae is an ascomycete fungus of the family Amorphothecaceae which is known to thrive in environments containing alkanes (and water), like aviation fuel, from which it derives its trivial name 'kerosene fungus'. As such it belongs to the heterogenous group of microbial contaminats of diesel fuel.

See also
Ascomycota#Metabolism
Fuel polishing
Candida keroseneae

References

Ascomycota enigmatic taxa